Maciej Przemysław Lang (born in 1968 in Piotrków Trybunalski) is a Polish political scientist, journalist and diplomat, PhD in Humanities. Ambassador of the Republic of Poland to Turkmenistan (2007–2009), Afghanistan (2009–2012), Kazakhstan (2015–2016), Turkey (2016–2018, since 2023), and Romania. (2020–2023), and Undersecretary of State in the Ministry of Foreign Affairs for Security, Asian Policy, American Policy, and African and Middle Eastern Policy (2018–2020).

Life 
He is an expert in the areas of Central Asia, the Middle East, including Iran, and petroleum issues in the region. He is fluent in English, Persian, French, Italian, and Russian.

Graduate of the Bolesław Chrobry Secondary School in Piotrków Trybunalski. In 1993 he graduated from the Faculty of Journalism and Political Science at the University of Warsaw. In 2016, he obtained a Ph.D. degree in the Faculty of Oriental Studies of the University of Warsaw, presenting the thesis “The concept of state and nation in the writings of Deobandi ulema”.

In the years 1993–1997 he worked in the Department of Migration and Refugees of the Ministry of Interior and Administration. In 1997 he joined the Ministry of Foreign Affairs. In the years 1997–2003, he was the counselor of the Embassy of the Republic of Poland in Almaty. After returning to Poland, he was a minister's advisor in the Department of Eastern Policy of the Ministry of Foreign Affairs. From March 2006 to January 2007, he Served at the Polish Embassy in Greece as chargé d’affaires. In 2007–2009 he was the first ambassador of the Republic of Poland in Ashgabat after the establishment of the branch, and from August 2009 to June 2012 he managed the Polish diplomatic mission in Kabul. From April 2014 to July 2015, he was the head of the regional team of observers of the OSCE in w Ukraine. In August 2015, he was appointed an extraordinary and plenipotentiary Ambassador of the Republic of Poland in Kazakhstan, and in November that year also accredited as Ambassador to Kyrgyzstan. In October 2016, he was appointed the Polish ambassador to Turkey. On November 5, 2018, he became the Undersecretary of State in the Ministry of Foreign Affairs responsible for economic diplomacy, development cooperation, relations with Asian, African and Middle East countries. In July 2020, he was nominated ambassador to Romania, presenting his credentials the same month. He ended his term in Bucharest on February 5, 2023 and was nominated for the second term as the ambassador to Turkey.

He is the author of publications and analytical studies devoted to Central Asia and the Middle East (including ethnic and demographic problems, peace processes and conflicts, and energy issues). He cooperated, among others with the Centre for Eastern Studies. He is a co-author of publications from the scientific series "Contemporary Central Asia" prepared by the Institute of Political Sciences of the University of Warsaw.

Honours 

 Officer’s Cross of the Order of Polonia Restituta (2012)
 Commander's Cross of the Order of Polonia Restituta (2022)

Works 
He authored a number of publications and analyses, mainly on Central Asia and the Middle East: 

Tradition of Migration in the Muslim Culture, 1998 
Changes in the Ethnic Composition of Kazakhstan in the 20th Century, 2000 
Civil War and Peace Process in Tajikistan, 2002 
The Aegean Question in the Greek-Turkish relations, 2003 
Religion and Politics in Islam, 2003 
The Kyrgyz People under the Yoke of the Russian Empire, 2004

Translations

 Muhammad Husayn Tabatabai: Zarys nauk islamu. Maciej Lang (trans.). Warszawa: s.n., 1992, pp. 170. OCLC 749407492.
 Murtazā Muţahharī: Poznanie Koranu. Maciej Lang (trans.). Piotrków Trybunalski: Wydawnictwo Episteme, 1992, pp. 144. OCLC 749206242.

References

1968 births
Ambassadors of Poland to Afghanistan
Ambassadors of Poland to Kazakhstan
Ambassadors of Poland to Romania
Ambassadors of Poland to Turkmenistan
Ambassadors of Poland to Turkey
Commanders of the Order of Polonia Restituta
Living people
Officers of the Order of Polonia Restituta
People from Piotrków Trybunalski
University of Warsaw alumni